Calman is a surname. Notable people with the surname include:

Kenneth Calman (born 1941), Scottish academic
Mel Calman (1931–1994), British cartoonist
Neil Calman, president, CEO, and co-founder of the Institute for Family Health
Stephanie Calman, author
Susan Calman, Scottish comedian
William Thomas Calman (1871–1952), Scottish zoologist

See also
McCalman, surname
Calman Commission and Calman Report, see Commission on Scottish Devolution
Calman–Hine report
Çalman, Vezirköprü, a village in Turkey